Seven Stories into Eight is a demo album by the neo-progressive rock band IQ. It was released in 1982 on cassette. In 1998, a new version of this work (Seven Stories into '98) was released as a studio album.

Track listing 
 "Capital Letters" – 3:46
 "About Lake Five" – 5:02
 "Intelligence Quotient" – 6:55
 "For Christ’s Sake" – 5:05
 "Barbell Is In" – 5:32
 "Fascination" – 5:56
 "For The Taking" – 4:17
 "It All Stops Here" – 6:58

Personnel
Peter Nicholls – lead vocals (tracks 6–8)
Mike Holmes – acoustic, electric & twelve-string guitars
Martin Orford – keyboards, lead vocals (tracks 3 & 5)
Tim Esau – bass guitar
Mark Rideout – drums, percussion (tracks 1, 3 & 4)
Paul Cook – drums, percussion (all other tracks)

References

IQ (band) albums
1982 albums